Nordjyske Stiftstidende is a daily regional newspaper published in Aalborg, Denmark. It is Denmark's second oldest newspaper.

History and profile
The newspaper was founded in 1767 as Nyttige og fornøyelige Jydske Efterretninger. In 1827, it merged with Aalborg's second newspaper  Aalborgs Stifts Adresse-Avis. The paper was known as Aalborg Stiftstidende until 1999.

The publisher of Nordjyske Stiftstidende is the Nordjyske Medier. The paper is published in broadsheet format. It has no political affiliation and has a liberal stance. The paper was also described as having a right-wing tradition in a 2006 study.

Nordjyske Stiftstidende has its headquarters in Aalborg. The paper now serves the whole of Vendsyssel and most of Himmerland and has local editions in Aalborg, Hjørring, Hobro, Frederikshavn, Fjerritslev, Skagen and Brønderslev.

Circulation
Nordjyske Stiftstidende had a circulation of 82,000 copies on weekdays and 98,000 copies on Sundays in the first quarter of 2000, making it one of the top 20 newspapers in the country. The circulation of the paper was 83,000 copies in 2002. In 2003 the paper had a circulation of 82,000 copies on weekdays and 94,000 copies on Sundays. Its circulation was 74,000 copies in 2004. The 2005 circulation of the paper was 69,000 copies on weekdays and 80,000 copies on Sundays. Its circulation was 62,075 copies in 2006.

In 2007 the circulation of Nordjyske Stiftstidende was 64,186 copies.

References

External links
 Official website

1767 establishments in Denmark
Danish-language newspapers
Mass media in Aalborg
Daily newspapers published in Denmark
Publications established in 1767